Apramāda (Sanskrit; Pali: appamāda; Tibetan Wylie: bag yod pa) is a Buddhist term translated as "conscientious"  or "concern". It is defined as taking great care concerning what should be adopted and what should be avoided.  In the Pāli Canon, a collection of the Buddha's earliest teachings, the term appamāda is quite significant and the essence of the meaning cannot be captured with one English word. "Heedfulness", "diligence", and "conscientiousness", are all words that capture some aspects of appamāda. It is identified as one of the eleven virtuous mental factors within the Mahayana Abhidharma teachings.

Etymology
The word is a negation of pamāda, which means "negligent" or "lax." Appamāda, therefore, means non-negligence, or non-laxity, non-intoxication, non-deluded correctly translated as "heedfulness", or whichever word fully captures the mood of the term. "Heedfulness", "diligence", and "conscientiousness", all captures certain aspects of the word.

Explanation
The Abhidharma-samuccaya states:

What is concern? From taking its stand on non-attachment (alobha), non-hatred (adveṣa), and non-deludedness (amoha) coupled with diligence (vīrya), it considers whatever is positive and protects the mind against things which cannot satisfy. Its function is to make complete and to realize all worldly and transworldly excellences.

Alexander Berzin states:
 A caring attitude (bag-yod, carefulness) is a subsidiary awareness that, while remaining in a state of detachment, imperturbability, lack of naivety, and joyful perseverance, causes us to meditate on constructive things and safeguards against leaning toward tainted (negative) things. In other words, being disgusted with and not longing for compulsive existence, not wanting to cause harm in response to its suffering, not being naive about the effects of our behavior, and taking joy in acting constructively, a caring attitude brings us to act constructively and to refrain from destructive behavior. This is because we care about the situations of others and ourselves and about the effects of our actions on both; we take them seriously.

Robert Thurman emphasizes the high degree of apramāda of someone who has realized emptiness (a.k.a. "voidness"):
 This denotes a type of awareness of the most seemingly insignificant aspects of daily life, an awareness derived as a consequence of the highest realization of the ultimate nature of reality. As it is stated in the Anavataptaparipṛcchasutra: "He who realizes voidness, that person is consciously aware." "Ultimate realization," far from obliterating the relative world, brings it into highly specific, albeit dreamlike, focus.

This term is described at length in chapter four of the Bodhicharyavatara.

Alternate translations
 A caring attitude (Alexander Berzin)
 Carefulness (Alexander Berzin)
 Conscious awareness (Robert Thurman)
 Conscientiousness
 Concern (Herbert Guenther)
 Prudent
 Heedfulness (often used in Theravāda sources)

See also 
 Buddhist meditation
 Mental factors (Buddhism)
 Mindfulness

References

Sources 
 Berzin, Alexander (2006), Primary Minds and the 51 Mental Factors
 Guenther, Herbert V. &  Leslie S. Kawamura (1975), Mind in Buddhist Psychology: A Translation of Ye-shes rgyal-mtshan's "The Necklace of Clear Understanding". Dharma Publishing. Kindle Edition.
 Kunsang, Erik Pema (translator) (2004). Gateway to Knowledge, Vol. 1. North Atlantic Books.
 Thurman, Robert (2008), The Holy Teaching of Vimalakirti, Pennsylvania State University

External links
 dhammapada appamada chapter English
  dhammapada appamada chapter Pali
  parinibbana sutta

Wholesome factors in Buddhism
Mindfulness (Buddhism)
Sanskrit words and phrases